Wiedemannia brevilamelata is a species of dance flies, in the fly family Empididae.

References

Wiedemannia
Insects described in 1985
Diptera of Europe